Otohiko (written: 乙彦) is a masculine Japanese given name. Notable people with the name include:

, Japanese politician
, Japanese businessman and banker
, Japanese businessman
, Japanese writer
, Japanese footballer

Japanese masculine given names